Doctor Adamski's Musical Pharmacy is the first studio album, second album overall, by English acid house DJ and record producer Adamski, released in 1990 on MCA Records. It includes the UK number one single "Killer", featuring singer Seal on vocals, which was also a top 10 hit worldwide, plus an extended version of the previous single "N-R-G" (UK No. 12) and follow-up singles "The Space Jungle" (UK No. 7) and "Flashback Jack" (UK No. 46).

Critical reception
Chuck Eddy from Entertainment Weekly felt the album "is less pretentious, more varied, and more fun. This time he tries to sing, and while he retains the electronic keyboard doodling he started out with, here he uses it as a break in the action rather than as an end in itself."

Track listing
All tracks written by Adam Tinley, except where noted.

Personnel
Adamski – vocals, producer, assistant producer
Natalie – all the girl voices
Ricky Lyte – rapping (track 7)
Toe B. Harrison – bongos (track 8)
Dan Bates – engineer
Eugene Romain – engineer (track 12)
Mike "Spike" Drake – engineer (track 6)
Management by Machat Management L.A.

Charts and certifications

Weekly charts

Certifications

References

External links
 Doctor Adamski's Musical Pharmacy at Discogs

1990 debut albums
MCA Records albums
Adamski albums